The 1999 Australian Formula Ford Championship was an Australian motor racing competition for Formula Ford cars. It was authorised by the Confederation of Australian Motor Sport as an Australian National Title. It was the 30th national series for Formula Fords to be held in Australia and seventh to be contested under the Australian Formula Ford Championship name.

The championship was won by Greg Ritter driving a Mygale SJ98 Ford.

Calendar
The championship was contested over an eight-round series  with two races per round.

Points system
Championship points were awarded on a 20-16-14-12-10-8-6-4-2-1 basis to the top ten finishers in each race.

Results

Note:
 All cars were required to use a designated Ford 1600cc crossflow engine.
 Race 1 of Round 1 at Eastern Creek was stopped prematurely due to an incident and only half points were awarded for that race.

References

External links
 Mygale Australia – Australian National Championships, mygale.gforceweb.com.au, as archived at web.archive.org

Australian Formula Ford Championship seasons
Formula Ford Championship